This article is the Electoral history of John Diefenbaker, the thirteenth Prime Minister of Canada.

A Progressive Conservative, he served one term as Prime Minister (1957–1963), defeating Louis St. Laurent.  He won three general elections (1957, 1958 and 1962), with one majority government and two minority governments.  He lost the 1963 election to Lester Pearson, who succeeded him as prime minister.  Diefenbaker led the party one last time in the 1965 election, but was again defeated by Pearson.

He stood for election to the House of Commons of Canada fifteen times.  He was defeated in his first two attempts (1925, 1926), but he was elected on his third try, in 1940.  Thereafter, he was elected an additional twelve times, until he died in office in 1979.

Diefenbaker sought the leadership of the Progressive Conservative Party three times, unsuccessfully in 1942 and 1948, before winning it in 1957.  Following the loss in the election in 1965, the party held a leadership convention in 1967 which he lost, ending his leadership of the Progressive Conservative party.  Robert Stanfield succeeded him as party leader.

Prior to election to the House of Commons, Diefenbaker was also involved in Saskatchewan provincial politics and municipal politics, but with little success.

Summary 

Diefenbaker ranks tenth out of twenty-three prime ministers for time in office, serving one term of five years and 305 days.

Diefenbaker is the only prime minister from Saskatchewan.

In 1920, Diefenbaker began his political career, starting with municipal politics.   At age 25, he was elected to the village council of Wakaw, Saskatchewan, where he operated his first law practice.

Diefenbaker would not win another election for twenty years.  In the intervening two decades, he lost five elections:  two at the federal level, two at the provincial level, and one at the municipal level.  It was not until 1940 that he finally won his second election, to the House of Commons.  From that point on, he never lost an election at the constituency level, winning thirteen straight elections to the Commons. Diefenbaker eventually died in office as a Member of Parliament.

At the federal level, Diefenbaker stood for election in the general elections of 1925 and 1926, but was defeated both times.  In the 1926 election, his Liberal opponent was the former prime minister, William Lyon Mackenzie King.  This is the only time two future prime ministers have directly opposed each other in the same riding.  After his election loss, Diefenbaker was a delegate to the 1927 Conservative convention which chose R.B. Bennett as leader of the party.  He also campaigned for the party in the 1935 election.

Diefenbaker was also very active, but unsuccessful, in provincial politics.  He stood for election in the provincial election of 1929, but was defeated.  In 1933 he was elected vice-president of the Saskatchewan Conservative Party.  After the Conservatives were wiped out in the provincial election of 1934, he became the acting president of the party.  In 1936, at the leadership convention, he was acclaimed as the leader of the party.  He led the party in the provincial election of 1938, running in the constituency of Arm River, but he and the party were both defeated.  No Conservatives were elected to the Legislative Assembly and the party earned only 12% of the provincial popular vote.  At the subsequent party convention four months after the election, Diefenbaker offered his resignation but it was refused.  The Conservatives were so decimated by the previous two elections that they had few members or supporters.  He remained leader of the party for the next two years.

In 1933, he ran for the mayor of Prince Albert, Saskatchewan, but was defeated by 48 votes.

In 1940, Diefenbaker was elected to the House of Commons, for the riding of Lake Centre.  Entering the Commons, he soon showed his leadership aspirations beginning with the Progressive Conservative leadership convention of 1942.  Although unsuccessful, he tried again in 1948 and 1956.  In 1942 he came in third;  in 1948 he came in second;  and in 1956 he won the leadership.  He would hold the leadership for eleven years, eventually being forced out at the 1967 convention, after the two losses in the general elections of 1963 and 1965.

Diefenbaker was elected to the Commons thirteen times (1940, 1945, 1949, 1953, 1957, 1958, 1962, 1963, 1965, 1968, 1972, 1974, and 1979), from 1940 until his death shortly after the election of 1979.  For eight straight elections (1957, 1958, 1962, 1963, 1965, 1972, and 1974), he won majorities even in multi-candidate races.  In four of those contests, he won majorities of over 65% (72.1% in 1958, 70.8% in 1962, 71.4% in 1963, and 65.5% in 1965).

He served in the House of Commons for a total of 39 years, 4 months, and 21 days.

Federal general elections: 1957 to 1965 

Diefenbaker led the Progressive Conservatives in five general elections.  He was successful in the general elections of 1957, 1958, and 1962, but was defeated in the elections of 1963 and 1965.

Federal election, 1957 

Diefenbaker led the Progressive Conservatives in the general election of 1957.  The election resulted in a minority government, with no party having a majority.  Although the Liberals came in first in the popular vote, they came in second in seats in the House of Commons, behind Diefenbaker and the Progressive Conservatives.  St. Laurent resigned and Diefenbaker formed a minority government, ending twenty-three years of Liberal rule.

1 Leader of the Opposition when election was called;  Prime Minister after election.
2 Prime Minister when election was called;  Leader of the Opposition after the election.
3 Table does not include parties which received votes but did not elect any members.

Federal election, 1958 

A year after winning the 1957 election, Diefenbaker led the Progressive Conservatives in the general election of 1958.  He won the biggest seat majority in Canadian history up to that time, 208 seats in a House of Commons with 265 seats. Diefenbaker formed a majority government, with a 151-seat majority over the other three parties combined.

1 Prime Minister when election was called;  Prime Minister after election.
2 Leader of the Opposition when election was called;  Leader of the Opposition after the election.
3 Table does not include parties which received votes but did not elect any members.

Federal election, 1962 

After four years of majority government, Diefenbaker again led the Progressive Conservatives to the polls, but lost almost one hundred seats and was reduced to a minority government.

1  Prime Minister when election was called;  Prime Minister after election.
2  Leader of the Opposition when election was called;  Leader of the Opposition after the election.
3 Table does not include parties which received votes but did not elect any members.

Federal election, 1963 

Diefenbaker's minority government following the 1962 election lasted less than a year.  His government was defeated on a motion of non-confidence in February, 1963, which resulted in the dissolution of Parliament and a general election.  Lester Pearson and the Liberals won the election, but fell five seats short of a majority.  Pearson become prime minister of a minority government, and Diefenbaker became Leader of the Opposition.

1 Leader of the Opposition when election was called;  Prime Minister after election.
2 Prime Minister when election was called;  Leader of the Opposition after the election.
3 Table does not include parties which received votes but did not elect any members.

Federal election, 1965 

After two years of minority government, Pearson and the Liberals called an election.  The result was another hung parliament.  The Liberals increased their seat total, but again fell short of an outright majority, this time by two seats.  Pearson governed as a minority government.  Diefenbaker initially continued as leader of the Opposition, but in 1966 he was ousted by a party revolt.  Robert Stanfield succeeded him as party leader.

1 Prime Minister when election was called;  Prime Minister after election.
2  Leader of the Opposition when election was called;  Leader of the Opposition after the election.
3 Table does not include parties which received votes but did not elect any members.

Federal constituency elections: 1925, 1926, 1940 to 1979 

Diefenbaker stood for election to the House of Commons fifteen times.  He was defeated in his first two attempts, but elected in 1940 onwards.

1925 Federal Election:  Prince Albert 

 Elected. 
X Incumbent.

1926 Federal election:  Prince Albert 

In the 1926 general election, Diefenbaker's opponent in Prince Albert riding was Mackenzie King.  This is the only occasion where two future prime ministers have run directly against each other in the same riding.

 Elected. 
X Incumbent.

1940 Federal election:  Lake Centre 

 Elected. 
X Incumbent.

1945 Federal election:  Lake Centre 

 Elected. 
X Incumbent.

1949 Federal election:  Lake Centre 

 Elected. 
X Incumbent.

1953 Federal election:  Prince Albert 

 Elected.

1957 Federal election:  Prince Albert 

 Elected. 
X Incumbent.

1958 Federal election:  Prince Albert 

 Elected. 
X Incumbent. 
1 Rounding error.

1962 Federal election:  Prince Albert 

 Elected. 
X Incumbent.

1963 Federal election:  Prince Albert 

 Elected. 
X Incumbent.

1965 Federal election:  Prince Albert 

 Elected. 
X Incumbent. 
1 Rounding error.

1968 Federal election:  Prince Albert 

 Elected. 
X Incumbent.

1972 Federal election:  Prince Albert 

 Elected. 
X Incumbent.

1974 Federal election:  Prince Albert 

 Elected. 
X Incumbent.

1979 Federal election:  Prince Albert 

 Elected. 
X Incumbent. 
1 Rounding error.

Saskatchewan general election: 1938 

Diefenbaker led the Saskatchewan Conservative Party in the general election of 1938.  The Conservatives did not win a single seat and only won 12% of the popular vote.  Diefenbaker was defeated in his own attempt to win the constituency of Arm River.

1 Premier when election was called;  Premier after election. 
2 Leader of the Opposition when election was called;  Leader of the Opposition after election.

Saskatchewan constituency elections: 1929, 1938 

Diefenbaker twice stood for election to the Legislative Assembly of Saskatchewan.  He was defeated in both elections.

1929 Saskatchewan Election:  Prince Albert 

 Elected. 
X Incumbent.

1938 Saskatchewan Election:  Arm River 

 Elected. 
X Incumbent.

Municipal politics

Village of Wakaw 

In 1920, Diefenbaker was elected to a three-year term on the village council of Wakaw, where he had established his first law practice.  He was 24 years old.

City of Prince Albert 
In 1933, Diefenbaker was a late entrant in the election for mayor of Prince Albert.  He lost by 48 votes.  His successful opponent was Harold John Fraser, who thirty years later ran against Diefenbaker in the Prince Albert riding in the 1963 federal election.

Progressive Conservative Party Leadership Conventions: 1942 to 1967 

Diefenbaker tried twice unsuccessfully to be elected leader of the Progressive Conservative Party, being defeated in 1942 and 1948, before winning the leadership in 1956.  He was challenged for the leadership eleven years later, in 1967 and was defeated.  Robert Stanfield was elected the party leader.

1942 Leadership Convention 

Just two years after being elected to the House of Commons, Diefenbaker ran for the leadership of the Progressive Conservative Party, coming in third in a field of five candidates.  John Bracken was elected leader.

1948 Leadership Convention 

Bracken resigned as party leader in 1948, leading to a second leadership convention in only six years.  Diefenbaker again contested the leadership, this time coming in second, after the winner, George Drew.

1956 Leadership Convention 

Drew resigned due to ill health.  In his third leadership contest, Diefenbaker won.

1967 Leadership Convention 

After losing the general elections in 1963 and 1965, Diefenbker was forced out of the leadership by a vote of the party organization and a leadership convention was called.  Diefenbaker decided to contest the leadership and was a late entrant to the convention.  He withdrew after coming in fifth on the third ballot.

1 Rounding error.

See also 

 Electoral history of Louis St. Laurent - Diefenbaker's predecessor as Prime Minister.
 Electoral history of Lester B. Pearson - Diefenbaker's principal opponent in three general elections and successor as Prime Minister.

References

Bibliography 

 Provincial Elections in Saskatchewan 1905-1986 (Chief Electoral Officer, Province of Saskatchewan).

External links 

Parliament of Canada - PARLINFO:  History of Federal Ridings since 1867
 Saskatchewan Archives - Executive and Legislative Directory - Election Results by Electoral Division

Diefenbaker, John